Aeger elegans is a species of fossil prawn from the Solnhofen Plattenkalk.

References

Dendrobranchiata
Jurassic crustaceans
Crustaceans described in 1839
Fossil taxa described in 1839
Solnhofen fauna